Michael S. Seadle (born 1950) is an information scientist and historian.
He is professor for digital libraries at the Berlin School of Library and Information Science at Humboldt-Universitaet zu Berlin. He was Chair of the iSchools from 2014 to 2016. In 2017 he became  the Executive Director with a term until March 2020. In 2016 he became one of the founders of the Humboldt-Elsevier Advanced Data and Text Centre (HEADT Centre) at Humboldt-Universität zu Berlin.

Career 
He received a BA in 1972 from  Earlham College, and  then a MA in 1973 and a Ph.D in history in 1977, from the University of Chicago. His thesis was on: Quakerism in Germany: the pacifist response to Hitler. He went on to become a supervisor at the library of the University of Chicago and later an assembly language programmer, data base manager and systems analyst for various corporations. From 1986 to 1987, he was a lecturer at Northwestern University.

From 1987 to 1989, Seadle was assistant director of the Computer Center for Academic Computing and User Support Services at Eastern Michigan University in Ypsilanti, Michigan, and subsequently  became assistant director of Library Technologies at Cornell University in Ithaca, New York. Between 1992 and 1996, he  was president of Seadle Consulting in East Lansing. In 1997 he obtained a Master of Science in Information from the University of Michigan and received the Margaret Mann Award. From 1998 to 2006 he established the Digital and Multimedia Center Michigan State University library and became assistant director of the library.

In 2006 Seadle became a professor at the Berlin School of Library and Information Science at Humboldt-Universitaet zu Berlin. He is currently Director of the School  and since 2010 dean of the Faculty of Arts I. In 2012 the Caucus of the iSchool group chose him as chair-elect with a term beginning in  March, 2014, at the iConference in Berlin.

Professional work 
 in collaboration with Peter Schirmbacher and Elisabeth Niggemann: "LOCKSS und KOPAL Infrastruktur und Interoperabilität" (LuKII), Deutsche Forschungsgemeinschaft, 2009
 in collaboration with Rainer Kuhlen: information infrastructure on (German) copyright in education and science (outlink:www.iuwis.de|IUWIS), Deutsche Forschungsgesellschaft, 2009-2011
 Workshop on Preservation Networks and Technologies, Deutsche Forschungsgesellschaft, 2007
 in collaboration with Ruth Ann Jones: "Making of Modern Michigan," Institute of Museum and Library Services Award, 2002-2005
 in collaboration with Richard Triemer: “The Euglenoid Project II: Restructuring Phylogeny And Taxonomy.” National Science Foundation award, 2003-2008
 in collaboration with Peter Berg: "Feeding America: The Historic American Cookbook Project," Institute of Museum and Library Services award, 2001-2004
 in collaboration with Peter Berg: "Shaping the Values of Youth: A Nineteenth Century American Sunday School Book Collection," Library of Congress/Ameritech National Digital Library award, 1999-2001
 "Digital Orchid Library," American Orchid Society award, 2001-2002
 in collaboration with Mark Kornbluh, John Deller, and Joyce Grant: "National Gallery of the Spoken Word," Digital Library Initiative (Phase 2) award, 1999-2004
 in collaboration with David Wiley, Fredric Bohm, Mark Kornbluh, Joseph Lauer: “Accessing African Scholarly Journals: Sustainable Electronic Publishing and Indexing of African Journals through International Cooperation,” Title VI International Education Program award, 1999-2004
 in collaboration with Mark Kornbluh, David Robinson, David Wiley: "Building a Multi-Lingual Digital Library for West African Sources," International Digital Library Initiative Award, 2000-2003

Recent books 
 Seadle, Michael, 2017, "Quantifying Research Integrity" (Morgan Claypool)
 Seadle, Michael, Chu, Clara, Stöckel, Ulrike, 2016,  “Educating the Profession: 40 years of the IFLA Section on Education and Training” DeGruyter. IFLA Series.

Editorial work 
 Editor, Library Hi Tech, UK, 1997-2016
 Editor-in-chief, World Digital Libraries: An International Journal, India, 2012-
 Editorial Board, Reference Services Review, UK, 1998-
 Editorial Board, Bibliothek: Forschung und Praxis, Germany, 2008-
 Member, LOCKSS (Lots of Copies Keeps Stuff Safe) Alliance Technical Policy Committee; chair, 2005-6
 Editorial board member, Journal for the Study of Radicalism, USA, 2007-2010
 Secretary, German-North American Resources Partnership, 2003-2008
 Chair, Germanists Discussion Group, Association of College and Research Libraries, 2005-2006.
 Member, Emerald / MCB University Press Research Fund Board, 2001-2004.
 Chair, Digitization Committee, Action Team for Library Advancement Statewide, 2001-2002
 Chair, Electronic Text Centers Discussion Group, American Library Association, 1998-2003
 Coordinator, Digital Libraries Group, German Resources Project, Association of Research Libraries, 1998-2003

References

External links 

 Publications of Michael Seadle
 Michael Seadle's homepage at the Berlin School of Library and Information Science
  Official CV
 Digital+Research=Blog (Michael Seadle's blog about digital libraries and long-term preservation)

1950 births
Living people
Place of birth missing (living people)
Earlham College alumni
Information scientists
Academic staff of the Humboldt University of Berlin
University of Chicago alumni
University of Michigan School of Information alumni